The 1987 Coppa Italia Final was the final of the 1986–87 Coppa Italia. The match was played over two legs on 7 and 13 June 1987 between Napoli and Atalanta. 
Napoli won 4–0 on aggregate.

First leg

Second leg

References
Coppa Italia 1986/87 statistics at rsssf.com
 https://www.calcio.com/calendario/ita-coppa-italia-1986-1987-finale/2/
 https://www.worldfootball.net/schedule/ita-coppa-italia-1986-1987/

Coppa Italia Final
Coppa Italia Finals
Coppa Italia Final 1987
Coppa Italia Final 1987
Coppa Italia Final